Flag is the sixth studio album by Swiss electronic duo Yello, released in 1988. It features an eight-minute version of "The Race", the edited version of which reached number 7 in the UK Singles Chart in August of that year. "The Race" was used as a trailer for Eurosport, and the opening theme to the US quiz show It's Academic.

An early cut of the album was used as the soundtrack for the film Nuns on the Run and is played during many of the chase scenes.

Track listing
All tracks written by Dieter Meier and Boris Blank.
 "Tied Up" – 6:05
 "Of Course I'm Lying" – 5:56
 "3rd of June" – 4:50
 "Blazing Saddles" – 3:53
 "The Race" – 8:08
 "Alhambra" – 3:38
 "Otto Di Catania" – 3:20
 "Tied Up in Red" (CD bonus track) – 8:23
 "Tied Up in Gear" – 3:58
 "The Race (Break Light Mix)" *
 "Wall Street Bongo" *
 "The Race (12″ Mix)" *

(*) Bonus tracks on the 2005 remastered release

Chart performance

Singles – UK Singles Chart / Millward Brown (United Kingdom)

Personnel
Yello
Dieter Meier - lyrics, vocals
Boris Blank – music composition, arrangements, vocals on "Blazing Saddles"
with:
Billy Mackenzie – backing chorus on "Of Course I'm Lying" and "Otto di Catania"
Leos Gerteis – clarinet on "Otto di Catania"
Chico Hablas – guitars on "Otto di Catania" and "Tied Up in Gear"
Beat Ash – drums, percussion on 1, 2, 5, 8, 9
Ernst Gamper - cover

Production
Arranged, produced, engineered and mixed by Yello
Mastered by Kevin Metcalfe

Certifications

References 

Yello albums
1988 albums
Fontana Records albums
Mercury Records albums
Vertigo Records albums